ESPN MLS ExtraTime is a sports video game released in 2001-2002 by Konami. It is available for PlayStation 2, GameCube, and Xbox. Clint Mathis is on the cover. The original ExtraTime was released for PS2 seven months after ESPN MLS GameNight on the PlayStation, with the GameCube and Xbox versions released in 2002 afterward as ESPN MLS ExtraTime 2002. MLS ExtraTime was the last in the series as the MLS sold its video game license to EA Sports' FIFA series.

Reception

The PS2 version received "generally favorable reviews", while the GameCube and Xbox versions received "average" reviews, according to the review aggregation website Metacritic. Frank O'Connor of NextGen called the original ExtraTime "one of two near-perfect renditions of the sport. PS2 soccer fans are spoiled indeed."

References

External links
 

2001 video games
Association football video games
ESPN video games
Konami games
Major League Soccer
GameCube games
North America-exclusive video games
PlayStation 2 games
Xbox games
Video games developed in Japan